Newport Food Festival is an annual food festival for held at Newport, Wales.

Overview
The festival was established in 2010 with over 80 businesses participating and takes place in October.  The event is free.

The festival has stages holding cooking demonstrations from local and national chefs. There is a chefs’ cook off and a teen chefs event. Food and drink stalls are located along High Street, the pedestrianised area of Bridge Street and on Westgate Square

Activities include live music, inflatable chefs on stilts, a balloon modelling magic chef,  face painting and colouring activities.

There was no festival in 2020 because of the COVID-19 pandemic.

Structure

The festival is organised by Newport City Council and supported by volunteers. It is sponsored by Tiny Rebel, Celtic Manor Resort, Newport Now Business Improvement District and Friars Walk, Newport

Further reading

Business Wales, Food and Drink

About Wales, Welsh Food Festivals

See also 

Cuisine of Wales
You Tube, Newport Food Festival 2018

References 

Food and drink festivals in the United Kingdom
Monmouthshire
Annual events in Wales
2011 establishments in Wales
Festivals established in 2011
Summer events in Wales